Caroline Church and Cemetery is a historic Episcopal church and cemetery and  also a national historic district at the junction of Dyke and Bates Roads in Setauket, Suffolk County, New York.  The church was built in 1729 and is a three-by-four-bay, heavy timber-framed, 42 by 30 foot building sheathed in wood shingles and covered by a gable roof. It features a 42-foot tower surmounted by a 25-foot spire. The complex also includes the parish house, built in 1905, and a barn built in 1893.  The cemetery was established in 1734.

It was added to the National Register of Historic Places in 1991.

Images

References

External links
Caroline Church Official Website

Historic districts on the National Register of Historic Places in New York (state)
Churches on the National Register of Historic Places in New York (state)
Churches completed in 1729
Churches in Suffolk County, New York
18th-century churches in the United States
National Register of Historic Places in Suffolk County, New York
1729 establishments in the Thirteen Colonies